The 2018 CAMS Porsche Wilson Security Carrera Cup Australia Series was an Australian motor racing competition for Porsche 911 GT3 Cup cars.
 The series, which was the 14th Porsche Carrera Cup Australia, commenced on 1 March at the Adelaide Street Circuit and finish on 21 October at the Surfers Paradise Street Circuit after eight rounds. 2018 saw the introduction of the Porsche 911 GT3 Cup type 991.II model to the series.

The series was won by Jaxon Evans.

Teams and drivers

Race calendar

Series standings 
Series standings are as follows:

References

External links
 

Australian Carrera Cup Championship seasons
Porsche Carrera Cup Australia